Theodor Rõuk (14 December 1891 – 21 July 1940) was an Estonian lawyer, politician and soldier.

Rõuk was born in Kabala Parish (now, part of Türi Parish). In 1924 he was Minister of Internal Affairs. Following the Soviet occupation of Estonia in 1940, Rõuk committed suicide in Tallinn, aged 48.

References

1891 births
20th-century Estonian lawyers
Estonian politicians
Ministers of the Interior of Estonia
Estonian military personnel of the Estonian War of Independence
People from Türi Parish
Suicides in Estonia
1940 suicides